Zhang Qi (born March 1961) is a former Chinese politician who spent most of his career in Hainan province. He was investigated by the Central Commission for Discipline Inspection (CCDI - the party's internal disciplinary body) and the National Supervisory Commission, the highest anti-corruption agency of China, in September 2019. Previously he served as Party chief of Haikou, capital of Hainan province. Zhang is the first senior official who was placed under investigation in Hainan since the Communist Party of China's 19th National Congress in late 2017 and the fourth incumbent provincial level official was sacked for graft since then.

Early life and education
Zhang was born in Shou County, Anhui, in March 1961. After the Resumption of College Entrance Examination, he was accepted to Hainan Normal University, where he majored in mathematics. After graduation, he worked as secretary of Communist Youth League of China there.

Career
In October 1991, he was transferred to Haikou, capital of Hainan province, and became an official in Hainan Provincial Government. In February 2003 he was promoted to become vice-mayor of Haikou, a position he held until May 2006, when he was appointed head of Hainan Provincial Tourism Bureau. He was mayor and deputy party chief of Danzhou in August 2008, and 14 months later promoted to the Party chief position. He became the Party chief of Sanya in October 2014, and served until November 2016. He was Party chief of Haikou in November 2016, and held that office until September 2019, when he was placed under investigation by the Central Commission for Discipline Inspection (CCDI), the party's internal disciplinary body, and the National Supervisory Commission, the highest anti-corruption agency of China.

Investigation and arrest
In September 2019, he was investigated for "suspected serious violations of disciplinary rules and laws" by the Central Commission for Discipline Inspection (CCDI), and the National Supervisory Commission. Police found 13.5 tonnes of gold hidden in his home during an anti-corruption raid. In addition to the gold, inspectors also discovered 268 billion yuan (£30 billion) in suspected bribes in his bank account, which would make him the richest man in China. 

On March 4, 2020, Zhang has been expelled from the Communist Party of China (CPC) and dismissed from public offices. On July 9, his trial was held at the Intermediate People's Court of Guangzhou. On December 3, the Intermediate People's Court of Guangzhou sentenced him to life in prison for accepting bribes. Qi was also stripped of all of his assets and permanently deprived of his political rights. Under Chinese law, Qi will likely also have to perform prison labor. The court said that Zhang Qi was found to have illegally accepted money and gifts amounting to over 107 million yuan (16.3 million U.S. dollars) while holding various Party and government positions between 2005 and 2019, abusing his positions to help organizations and individuals in areas such as land development and project contracting. His subordinates, Wang Tieming, Lan Wenquan, Zhu Yongsheng, and Deng Min were sacked for graft before he stepped down in September 2019.

Personal life
Zhang married Qian Ling, who is a businesswoman.

References

1961 births
People from Huainan
Living people
Hainan Normal University alumni
People's Republic of China politicians from Anhui
Chinese Communist Party politicians from Anhui
Expelled members of the Chinese Communist Party